Matthew Alexander Dolan (born 11 February 1993) is an English footballer who plays for League Two side Hartlepool United on loan from Newport County. He is primarily a midfielder, but has often played as a central defender in recent seasons.

Career

Middlesbrough
Dolan began his career at Middlesbrough and in July 2010 was awarded a four-year professional contract with the club, and was captain of their U21 side.

On 4 January 2013, Dolan joined Football League One side Yeovil Town on a months loan deal, and made his debut as a substitute in their Football League Trophy area semi-final defeat against Leyton Orient. He played his first League One match for the club in the 2–0 win at Sheffield United. Dolan only managed five appearances for Yeovil in his first spell on loan before returning to the Riverside due to injury. On 27 March 2013, Dolan unexpectedly returned to Yeovil for a second loan spell this time until the end of the 2012–13 season. On 29 March 2013, Dolan made his first appearance of his second loan spell for Yeovil as a second-half substitute in a goalless draw against Walsall. On 1 April, he scored his first goal in professional football in the 2–1 away win at Notts County, with a goal scored direct from a free kick. Dolan appeared as a second-half substitute in the 2013 League One play-off final as Yeovil beat Brentford 2–1 to secure promotion to the Football League Championship. Dolan returned to Middlesbrough having made nine appearances for Yeovil, in all competitions, in a loan spell hampered by injuries.

In August 2013, Dolan joined his home-town team Hartlepool United on a one-month loan deal, linking up with former Middlesbrough coaches Colin Cooper and Craig Hignett. This loan was extended in October. Dolan then scored his first goal for the club, in a 3–1 win over AFC Wimbledon on 22 October 2013. This was followed up his second came on 26 December 2013, in a 1–1 draw against Chesterfield. In January, Dolan returned to Middlesbrough. He made 24 appearances in all competitions for Hartlepool, scoring twice.

Under the management of Aitor Karanka, Dolan was the among players to be offload as part of Karanka's reducing the squad size. So on 1 September 2014 Dolan agreed to join Bradford City on loan until the end of the season.

Bradford City
On 6 May 2014, Dolan agreed to join Bradford City on a one-year contract.

He moved on loan to Hartlepool United on 27 November 2014. He made only two appearances for Pools when he was recalled to Bradford City due to an injury.

Yeovil Town
Following his release from Bradford City, Dolan agreed to sign for League Two side Yeovil Town on a two-year deal from the 1 July 2015. In his two years with Yeovil, Dolan played 94 times in all competitions.

Newport County
On 7 June 2017, Dolan rejected the offer of a new contract from Yeovil to sign for fellow League Two side Newport County on a two-year contract. He made his debut for Newport on the opening day of the 2017–18 season, in a 3–3 draw at Stevenage. On 10 November 2017 Dolan scored his first goal for Newport in the 1–1 draw against Port Vale in League Two. On 26 January 2019 Dolan scored the equalising goal in the 93rd minute against Championship club Middlesbrough in the FA Cup fourth round 1–1 draw. Newport won the replay 2–0 and progressed to the FA Cup fifth round home tie against reigning Premier League champions Manchester City. Manchester City won the match 4–1. Dolan scored the winning goal in the 2018–19 League Two play-off semi-final penalty shoot-out against Mansfield Town. In the League Two play-off final at Wembley Stadium on 25 May 2019, Newport lost to Tranmere Rovers 1–0 after a goal in the 119th minute. In June 2019 Dolan signed a two-year contract extension with Newport County. In April 2021 Dolan was named as the 2021 EFL League Two Player in the Community for his "exceptional attitude to County in the Community initiatives". Also in April 2021 Dolan extended his Newport contract until the end of the 2022–23 season. Dolan played for Newport in the League Two play-off final at Wembley Stadium on 31 May 2021 which Newport lost to Morecambe, 1–0 after a 107th minute penalty. In June 2021 Dolan was selected as the Newport County player of the year for the 2020–21 season.

Hartlepool United
On 5 January 2023, Dolan signed for Hartlepool United on loan, the deal will automatically convert to a permanent contract at the start of the 2023–24 season.

Career statistics

Honours
Yeovil Town
Football League One play-offs: 2013

Individual
Newport County Player of the Year: 2020–21

References

External links

Living people
1993 births
Footballers from Hartlepool
People educated at English Martyrs School and Sixth Form College
English footballers
Association football midfielders
English Football League players
Middlesbrough F.C. players
Yeovil Town F.C. players
Hartlepool United F.C. players
Bradford City A.F.C. players
Newport County A.F.C. players